Sergio Jiménez (December 17, 1937 – January 3, 2007), born in Mexico City, was a Mexican actor who became famous after portraying the character of El Gato in the film Los caifanes. His last work was directing the telenovela La fea más bella. Sergio also worked in his "actor's studio" that he operated with actress Adriana Barraza (nominated for an Oscar as Best Supporting Actress for Babel). He is known in the Mexican community as "El Profe" (the teacher).

Some films
 Los caifanes
 El Profe
 Mexicano tú puedes
 El jinete de la divina providencia
 El extensionista
 La generala
 Las visitaciones del diablo
 Pelo suelto
 Perdóname Todo
 Hijo de puta
 La Faccia violenta di New York Sergio 1975

Telenovela
 Valentina
 Baila conmigo
 La antorcha encendida
 Senda de gloria
 El maleficio
 El derecho de nacer

Sources
 El Universal
 

1937 births
Mexican male film actors
Mexican male telenovela actors
Mexican telenovela directors
Mexican male stage actors
Male actors from Mexico City
2007 deaths
Mexican theatre directors